Chalcosyrphus cuprescens is a species of hoverfly in the family Syrphidae.

Distribution
Panama.

References

Eristalinae
Insects described in 1941
Diptera of North America
Taxa named by Frank Montgomery Hull